Pavel Fyodorovich Sadyrin (18 September 1942 – 1 December 2001) was a Soviet and Russian footballer and manager.

Career
Sadyrin played as a midfielder for Zvezda Perm and Zenit Leningrad.

As a manager, he led Zenit to their only Soviet championship in 1984. In 1991, he won the cup and the last Soviet title with CSKA Moscow. Sadyrin also won promotions to the top flight with CSKA (in 1989) and Zenit (in 1995).

Sadyrin was the manager of Russia national team in 1992-1994 and led Russia at the 1994 FIFA World Cup.

In 2001, he died of cancer.

Honours
Zenit Leningrad
Soviet Top League: 1984
Soviet Super Cup: 1985

CSKA Moscow
Soviet Top League: 1991
Soviet Cup: 1991

References

External links
 Profile at RussiaTeam 

1942 births
2001 deaths
Sportspeople from Perm, Russia
Soviet footballers
Russian footballers
Soviet football managers
Russian football managers
Russian Premier League managers
FC Zenit Saint Petersburg managers
FC Krystal Kherson managers
PFC CSKA Moscow managers
FC Zenit Saint Petersburg players
Soviet Top League players
1994 FIFA World Cup managers
Russia national football team managers
Uzbekistan national football team managers
Expatriate football managers in Uzbekistan
Russian expatriate sportspeople in Uzbekistan
FC Rubin Kazan managers
Deaths from cancer in Russia
Russian expatriate football managers
Association football midfielders
FC Zvezda Perm players